Thomas Andrew Stechschulte (November 1948 – June 7, 2021) was an American film and television actor. His most prominent role may have been that of the Presidential candidate Robert Arthur in The Manchurian Candidate. He has also had guest appearances on the television series Law & Order, Law & Order: Criminal Intent, and Mrs. Columbo.

Stechschulte was a prolific audiobook narrator, having performed, among others: Ken Kesey's, "Sometimes A Great Notion"; Cormac McCarthy's No Country for Old Men and The Road, James Ellroy's The Black Dahlia, Tim O'Brien's The Things They Carried, Philipp Meyer's American Rust, Marjorie Kinnan Rawlings's The Yearling, H.G. Bissinger's Friday Night Lights, Larry McMurtry's The Last Kind Words Saloon, and Dennis Lehane's Shutter Island. He gave voice to several members of the Holland Family in various James Lee Burke novels, alternating with Will Patton. He also narrated the Watchmen: Motion Comic series.

He died on June 7, 2021, at the age of 72.

Filmography

References

External links

Audiofile Narrator: Remembering Tom Stechschulte

1948 births
2021 deaths
American male film actors
American male television actors
Audiobook narrators
People from Mt. Lebanon, Pennsylvania